The Germanicus Trilogy is a trilogy of alternate history  of books written by Kirk Mitchell. The trilogy consists of Procurator (1984), New Barbarians (1986) and Cry Republic (1989). It is set in an alternate universe where Rome never fell due to Pontius Pilate pardoning Joshua bar-Joseph (Christ) and the Romans winning a decisive victory at Teutoburg Forest, which allows for the Latinization of Greater Germania.

The World
The world of the Germanicus Trilogy is portrayed as being stagnant and technologically backwards compared to our timeline, a fact that Germanicus blames on the archaic imperial system of government. With a force of slave-laborers, Rome never industrialized, limiting the extent to which it can modernize. This means that technology advances only through necessity. One of the themes of the novel is the extent to which Rome has stagnated; the imperial system and government has remained virtually untouched for two thousand years. This becomes prevalent in the war against the Aztecae, during which Roman galleys, still reliant on naval boarding, are decisively defeated by the Aztec fleet that utilizes true battleships. This conflict provokes a major naval reorganization and the development of the first Roman battleships.

Major Powers

Roman Empire
Although inefficient and lethargic, Rome is the foremost power across Europe, and its territories extend into Africa and across the Atlantic to the Novo Provinces in America. The Pax Romana maintains peace, although German and Hiberian rebel movements are a constant threat to the Empire. The Empire has stagnated however, and the senators have become completely powerless and are unwilling to change the system. Germanicus, however, dedicates his rule as Caesar to restoring the Senate and Republic, believing this will hold together Rome in the future.
Leader: Emperor Fabius (Procurator), Emperor Germanicus Julius Aztecus Caesar (New Barbarians), Lord Regent Decimus Antonius Nepos (Cry Republic, acting as steward for Emperor Quintus Nero)

Serican Empire
Little is known about the Serican Empire. They conquered Nihonia (Japan) after a decisive naval battle and occupy much of Asia. They prefer to act through proxies, such as the Aztecae, and have started to extend their influence towards the east of America from their supposed colony in California, wishing to remove the Roman provinces there. Roman traders occasionally trade with them via the Silk Road.
Leader: Emperor of the Xing

Aztecan Empire
The Aztecan Empire (previously called the Mexicae Empire) was, at one point, the dominant power in the Americas, taking tribute from much of Central America and demanding thousands of sacrifices. Ultimately, the bloodthirsty nature of the Empire destroys it, as many of the oppressed tribes join the Roman legions in sacking Tenochtitlan. After the Empire is dismantled, it became the Roman province of Novo Brittania, under the rule of Procurator Khalid of Anatolia.
Leader: Nominally Emperor Maxtla, administrated by Lord Tizoc (New Barbarians), Procurator Khalid (Cry Republic)

Books

Procurator
Procurator introduces audiences to the main character of the series, Germanicus Julius Agricola (later Germanicus Julius Agricola Caesar, then finally Germanicus Julius Agricola Aztecus Caesar). He is described as a military veteran nearing retirement, and is installed as the procurator of the province of Anatolia. Germanicus fights against an uprising, supported by stories about the mental ability of "massing" by the zaims of Anatolia. Ultimately, a coup is revealed that kills Emperor Fabius, and most of the royal family. As the closest relative, Germanicus becomes Emperor and returns to Rome. Whether the power of "massing" exists or not is left vague by the novel.

New Barbarians
The Novo Provinces in Mexico and the Aztec Empire have been at an uneasy peace for some time, when, in preparation for a One-Reed Year, Emperor Maxtla launches war against the Roman colonies. As Emperor, Germanicus heads to the New World in order to command the Roman troops through the war. After being defeated in the Aztec Sea by Serican (Chinese) supported Aztec vessels, he arrives in the Novo Provinces with Tora, a captured Nihonian. Despite urgings from Rome, and from a native woman, Alope, Germanicus decides to not attack the central Aztec Empire, instead to simply push them out of the Novo Provinces. In order to force his hand, Alope surrenders herself to the Aztecs, so that she would be sacrificed. Germanicus, realising that both Epizelus and Alope are in danger continues to push the Aztecs back, until only Tenochtitlan remains. With help from Tora, he fords Lake Texcoco with sand-galleys, and sacks Tenochtitlan, only to discover that Alope has already been killed.

Cry Republic
Having returned from the Siege of Tenochtitlan, Germanicus starts trying to restore the power of the senate, in preparation for stepping down as Emperor and restoring the Roman Republic. However, Decimus Antonius Nepos decides to play on the fears of the senators and enacts a swift coup. Germanicus is rescued with the help of sewer-dwellers by Rolf and Tora, who then take him to safety. The three then go their separate ways; Germanicus looking for supporters or respite in Anatolia, Tora to the Serican (Chinese) Empire in the East, and Rolf returning to his native Germania. Rolf, convinced that without Germanicus, the Roman Empire doesn't deserve to continue, leads the German Gothic tribes in a revival, attacking the outposts of new Emperor Nepos. Germanicus, in Anatolia, starts looking for supporters, and, spurred on by a vision of Fabius, declares manumission, and gathers an army to fight Nepos. As Nepos heads to Masada to confront him, his rail-galley is destroyed in a German ambush led by Rolf, and Nepos himself killed. As Nepos' army breaks apart, Germanicus decides to head back to Rome to restore the Republic.

Characters

Germanicus
Germanicus is a military veteran who is planning to retire at the beginning of Procurator. However, when Emperor Fabius is killed, he himself is forced to become Emperor. Germanicus, although experienced, is somewhat of an idealist, dedicated to restoring the Roman Republic. Through New Barbarians, he plans to restore some provinces to senatorial control, and realizes that he may need to abandon the New World colonies through the turbulence as Rome makes the transition. When he is betrayed by Nepos, he becomes jaded and remarks that the name "Julius": "means nothing any more". However, supported by the Anatolian Mara, he gathers support and tries to take back the Empire. Germanicus' eventual fate is left unknown, though it is implied that he feels some respect towards the Anatolian/Jewish god (the last line of the series remarks that: "Caesar had knelt"). At the end of the series, Germanicus is surrounded by a loyal army of Jews and Anatolians, and Nepos' army is routed, leading rise to the possibility that he may try to take back Rome.

Rolf
A German soldier and legionary, Rolf is extremely loyal to Germanicus, fighting alongside him in Anatolia, against the Aztecs, and finally in his name against Nepos' empire. He finds himself torn between his German heritage and his Roman training. He admires Germanicus, and sees Roman soldiers as being courageous, unlike many other Goths but holds contempt for the Roman patricians. Rolf's fate at the closing of the series is likewise unknown. He is scarred by a flamethrower wielded by Nepos, but his German soldiers believe that the wound is not fatal. Whether he remains as German Herzog or not is completely unknown.

Tora
From Serican-occupied Nihonia, Tora is a military engineer and a scientist. He refers to himself as a follower of Yinshaya: a "total submission to reason". Tora is irritated by the fact that Rome has little understanding of technology: pretty much all modern technology was invented by former Emperor Fabius or the Greek Ptolemaeus. He develops a biplane between the Roman conquest of the Aztec Empire and Nepos' coup, called a cloud-galley by the Romans. Tora returns to the Serican Empire, where he becomes a vassal to the Xing Emperor, though remaining loyal enough to Germanicus to believe that he has survived and will regain his empire.

Minor Characters

Decimus Antonius Nepos
Formerly Germanicus' praetorian prefect, Nepos seizes the opportunity to take the empire, and shows no regret when this action leads him to face Rolf with little hope of surviving. He says that Germanicus didn't "deserve" the Empire, because he couldn't hold onto it, ironic considering that neither could Nepos. Nepos is similar in many ways to Gaius Nero from New Barbarians in being praetorian prefect and seeking to become emperor, although Nero's plan is foiled whilst Nepos' succeeds in taking control of the Empire. Nepos is killed by Rolf, and his army routed.

Colonel Crispa
A Scandian colonel whom Germanicus falls in love with briefly in Procurator. She uses this to manipulate the native Anatolians into revolting against the empire as part of a plot to kill Fabius. Crispa is killed by Rolf on Germanicus' orders.

Alope
A Native American, Alope tries to use the Romans to destroy Maxtla's Empire and the Aztec domination of her people, the Indee. Knowing Germanicus' infatuation, she lures him to Tenochtitlan, but is killed on the sacrificial altar before the city is taken.

Mara
An Anatolian whom Germanicus meets when he flees to Anatolia. She looks after him, and joins with him when he gathers support to take back Rome. By the end of the series, Mara develops respect for Germanicus, but despite his feelings for her, still sees him as a pagan, and tells him that a union between them is impossible.

Epizelus
A Greek physician, Epizelus is Germanicus' personal physician in Procurator, becoming the chief scientific aide to him in New Barbarians. However, he is replaced by Tora in Cry Republic after leaving to recover from his ordeal with the Aztecs.

Joshua Bar Joseph
Although never appearing in any of the three books, and now long dead, Jesus of Nazareth is mentioned by many of the characters. It is implied that with Christianity stillborn in the Roman Empire, he travelled east into the Serican Empire. Germanicus hears that his pardon given by Pontius Pilate was critical to the Roman Empire's survival from an oracle, Tora mentions that his pseudo-religion of Yinshaya was founded by a Galilean holy man in the Serican Empire who he names as "Star-Sorter".

Fabius
Emperor Fabius is often mentioned during Procurator, as well as his numerous accomplishments; such as the sand-galley and the index (compass). Many soldiers announce themselves by saying "Hail Fabius" throughout Procurator. Fabius is portrayed as being less idealistic and more politically skilled than Germanicus, pointing out that he "survived twenty years on the Palatine" before his wife murdered him, whilst Germanicus didn't manage two. When Germanicus is ready to give up all hope in Anatolia, he sees a vision of Fabius who advises him to call for manumission to take back his empire.

Technology
Most modern technology was invented by the partnership of Emperor Fabius and Ptolemaeus or by Tora. Most technology is either named for old Roman equipment or, in the case of moving vehicles, the Roman seagoing galley.

Niter Pieces
Niter powder has very similar properties to gunpowder. It is used to fuel both handheld weapons and larger artillery.

Pilum
The pilum is a rifle, fueled by niter powder and the standard weapon for legionaries and praetorian guardsmen. Pilum is assumed to be the Roman term, since "Niter Piece", an obscure real world term, seems to be a more general name for such weapons. It is named for the Roman spear, the pilum. In New Barbarians, the Aztecs previously had air-powered versions, which become gunpowder-powered thanks to Serican influence.

Ballista
A large artillery gun powered by niter powder, ballista are named for the ancient Roman siege bolt thrower.

Vehicles

Rail-Galley
The equivalent of a train, rail-galleys are used to transport men and equipment across the vast Roman Empire, since automobiles are in their infancy. The Great Artery is a long railway running through Rome and heading all the way to Anatolia.

Sand-Galley
A large tracked "ship" like vehicle that was designed as a siege weapon by Emperor Fabius. It is similar to a real-world tank, although it is a good deal larger. The idea of it being a "sand-galley" is similar to Winston Churchill's description of tanks as "land-ships". Sand-Galleys are armed with a single ballista, which is designed to fire only straight ahead, as it was designed primarily as a siege weapon. When Germanicus has a vision of our timeline, he notices what seems to be an American tank, and at first mistakes it for a sand-galley.

Cloud-Galley
The prototype cloud-galley is invented by Tora between New Barbarians and Cry Republic. It is a biplane, powered by an internal combustion engine and (according to the cover illustrations), has a rear-facing propeller.

Automobiles
Lorries moving troops or laborers appear several times in fields. Tora notices their absence during his flight above Rome, noting that "by ancient decree", they are not permitted on Rome's streets early in the day.

Ships
Triremes, biremes and quinqueremes are all mentioned during New Barbarians. Rather than being defined by banks of oars, the names refer to the number of screw propellers on the boats. Despite being armed with near-modern equipment, the ships are still designed to be used as traditional Roman ships; boarding enemy galleys rather than attacking them directly. Contact with the Aztec/Serican fleet forces the Roman Empire to develop battleships for the first time during New Barbarians.

Alternate history book series
Alternate history novels set in ancient Rome